Sir Rupert may refer to:

 Sir Rupert Bromley (born 1936), retired businessman
 Sir Rupert Clarke (1920-2005), decorated soldier, businessman and pastoralist
 Sir Rupert Clarke (Senior) (1865-1926), 2nd Baronet of Rupertswood
 Sir Rupert Grant Alexander Clarke (born 1947), son of Sir Rupert Clarke
 Sir Rupert Hart-Davis (1907-1999), British publisher, literary editor, and man of letters
 Sir Rupert Mackeson, 2nd Baronet (born 1941), British author